The 2016 ACBS Asian Under-21 Snooker Championship was an amateur snooker tournament that is taking place from 1 March to 8 March 2016 in Colombo, Sri Lanka. It is the 17th edition of the ACBS Asian Under-21 Snooker Championship and also doubles as a qualification event for the World Snooker Tour.

The tournament was won by the number 3 seed Wang Yuchen of China who defeated Thailand's Ratchayothin Yotharuck 6–5 in the final to win the championship, as a result Yuchen was given a two-year card on the professional World Snooker Tour for the 2016/2017 and 2017/2018 seasons.

Results

References

2016 in snooker
Snooker amateur tournaments
Sport in Colombo
2016 in Sri Lankan sport
International sports competitions hosted by Sri Lanka
March 2016 sports events in Asia